
Gmina Gościno is an urban-rural gmina (administrative district) in Kołobrzeg County, West Pomeranian Voivodeship, in north-western Poland.

Before 2011 it was classed as a rural gmina, becoming urban-rural on 1 January 2011 when Gościno became a town.

Villages
Apart from the town of Gościno, the gmina contains the villages and settlements of Dargocice, Gościno-Dwór, Jarogniew, Jeziorki, Kamica, Karkowo, Lubkowice, Mołtowo, Myślino, Ołużna, Pławęcino, Pobłocie Małe, Ramlewo, Robuń, Sikorzyce, Skronie, Wartkowo, Wierzbka Dolna, Wierzbka Górna and Ząbrowo.

Neighbouring gminas
Gmina Gościno is bordered by the gminas of Dygowo, Karlino, Kołobrzeg, Rymań, Siemyśl and Sławoborze.

German names
Some places (administrative units called in Polish ′Sołectwa′) in and near the district are listed below with their German names (in brackets):

Dargocice (Eickstedtswalde)
Karkowo (Karkow)
Mołtowo (Moltow)
Myślino (Moitzlin)
Ołużna (Seefeld)
Pławęcino (Plauenthin)
Pobłocie Małe (Klein Pobloth)
Ramlewo (Ramelow)
Robuń (Rabuhn)
Wartkowo (Wartekow)
Ząbrowo (Semmerow)

Other localities:
Gościno-Dwór (Groß Jestin-Gut)
Jarogniew (Karlshof)
Jeziorki (Seehof)
Kamica (Kämitz)
Lubkowice (Johannisberg)
Sikorzyce (Meisegau)
Skronie (Krühne)
Wierzbka Dolna (Groß Vorbeck)
Wierzbka Górna (Klein Vorbeck).

Neighboring localities:
Dygowo (Degow)
Kołobrzeg (Kolberg)
Rymań (Roman)
Siemyśl (Simötzel) in Powiat Kołobrzeski,
Karlino (Körlin) in Powiat Białogardzki (Kreis Belgard (Persante))
Sławoborze (Stolzenberg) in Powiat Świdwiński (Kreis Schivelbein)

References
Polish official population figures 2006

Goscino
Kołobrzeg County